The Huangpu Bridge carries expressway traffic over two branches of the Pearl River in Guangzhou, Guangdong, China. The bridge is a combined suspension and cable-stayed bridge.

Construction of the bridge began in December 2003 and it was opened for traffic in December 2008. The bridge carries traffic on the G0425 Guangzhou–Macau Expressway and the G1508 Guangzhou Ring Expressway.

See also
 List of bridges in China
 List of longest suspension bridge spans
 List of tallest bridges in the world

References

External links

En.ccccltd.cn
Koti.kontu.la
Onlinelibrary.wiley.com
Crbbi.com

Suspension bridges in China
Bridges in Guangzhou
Bridges over the Pearl River (China)
Bridges completed in 2008